Antonio Giovanni Battisto Peresinotti  (Russian:Антонио Перезинотти; 1708, Bologna - 28 October 1778, Saint Petersburg) was an Italian-born Russian painter and academician who taught decorative art and perspective at the Imperial Academy of Arts.


Biography
He was apprenticed to the decorative painter, Girolamo Bon (c. 1700-1766). Bon and his new wife Rosa (a comic opera singer) went to Saint Petersburg in 1735, where he had been offered work as a scenic designer. In 1742, Bon invited two of his former students, Peresinotti and Giuseppe Valeriani to join him there. Peresinotti eventually advanced from being a theater painter to working for the Imperial court.

While there, he also took several students. The engraver,  worked with him from 1748 to 1754. The landscape painter, was his apprentice from 1756.

In 1766, he was appointed to the Imperial Academy and began teaching classes there. He received the title of "Academician" in 1767 and became a member of the Council of Professors. He was especially fond of depicting ruins, and often assigned his students to paint them. His most famous student there was Fyodor Alekseyev.

Most of his work has not been preserved. Only two stand-alone paintings are known, both landscapes with ruins, on display at the Academy's museum. Wall paintings at the Peterhof Palace are also notable.

References

Further reading 
 Igor Grabar, Моя жизнь. Этюды о художниках (My Life Studies on Artists), 2001. 
 Andrei Somov, Перезинотти, Антонио in the Brockhaus and Efron Encyclopedic Dictionary

External links

1708 births
1778 deaths
Italian painters
Muralists
Imperial Academy of Arts
Italian emigrants to Russia